The province of Pangasinan has 1,364 barangays comprising its 44 towns and 4 cities.

Pangasinan is ranked at 3rd with the most number of barangays in a Philippine province, only behind Iloilo and Leyte.

Barangays

References

Pangasinan
Populated places in Pangasinan